Liam Griffin may refer to:

 Liam Griffin (hurler) (born 1945/7), retired Irish hurling manager and former player
 Liam Griffin (racing driver) (born 1974), British auto racing driver and